Derek Geoffrey Hersey (26 October 1956 – 28 May 1993) was a British rock climber and for many years an active participant in the Boulder, Colorado climbing scene.

Climbing specialization
Hersey specialized in unroped "free solo" climbing, often in the 5.10–5.11 range; he died during such a free solo climb. Few climbers have tried to repeat his achievements, which include many of Colorado's hardest traditional routes.

Background
Originally from Stretford, Greater Manchester, England, Hersey referred to Eldorado Canyon as his 'office', where he could be seen on any day of the week, if not on a road trip to Yosemite National Park or elsewhere. He also referred to Boulder, Colorado's Liquor Mart as 'The Shrine', and described his climbing-chalk bag as 'my bag of courage'. Hersey was featured in Climbing Magazine and posthumously in the film Front Range Freaks. He spoke with a strong Manchester accent.

Hersey was introduced to climbing by his father, who went hiking near Manchester every week. Hersey learned to climb on the gritstone of the Peak District National Park in Derbyshire. In 1983, after being unemployed for five years in England, Hersey decided to travel to the United States, where he lived for the rest of his life.

Hersey's efforts to push the limits of his sport earned him the nickname "Dr. Death". Hersey was perhaps best known for his exploits in Eldorado Canyon, but his résumé included many other challenging ascents (and descents). Among them was his free-solo ascent of Crack of Fear, a sustained 5.10+ off-width route at Lumpy Ridge, Colorado; and an impressive effort on the Diamond (a  wall on Longs Peak), when he free-soloed ascents of two routes and downclimbed another in a single day. He was well known for pumping up and down laps on the sustained 5.10 route Rosy Crucifixion in Eldorado Canyon as a work-out regime.

Death
Derek Hersey died on 28 May 1993 in an accident while soloing the Steck-Salathé Route without protective gear, on Sentinel Rock in Yosemite National Park. He fell several hundred feet to his death.  Craig Luebben, a friend of Hersey, speculated that he encountered a slippery rock. Although there was no rainfall officially reported in the area that day, a later report concluded that "rain-slicked rock" contributed to his fall.
The search for Hersey's body was featured in a report on the CBS News program 48 Hours.

References

External links

1956 births
1993 deaths
British rock climbers
Deaths in Yosemite National Park
Free soloists
Mountaineering deaths
People from Stretford
Sports deaths in California